Toh Ee Wei (born 18 September 2000) is a Malaysian badminton player from Malacca. She was the girls' doubles silver medalist at the 2018 Asian and World Junior Championships. She also won the 2016 World Junior bronze medal in the mixed doubles event.

Achievements

World Junior Championships 
Girls' doubles

Mixed doubles

Asian Junior Championships 
Girls' doubles

BWF International Challenge/Series (5 titles, 1 runner-up) 
Mixed doubles

  BWF International Challenge tournament
  BWF International Series tournament

References 

2000 births
Living people
People from Malacca
Malaysian sportspeople of Chinese descent
Malaysian female badminton players
21st-century Malaysian women